Chmielno may refer to the following places in Poland:
Chmielno, Lower Silesian Voivodeship (south-west Poland)
Chmielno, Pomeranian Voivodeship (north Poland)
Chmielno, West Pomeranian Voivodeship (north-west Poland)